Justin Posey (born November 17, 1993) is an American male BMX rider, representing his nation at international competitions. He competed in the time trial event at the 2015 UCI BMX World Championships.

References

External links
 
 

1993 births
Living people
BMX riders
American male cyclists
Place of birth missing (living people)